Viola Osborne Baskerville (born October 29, 1951) is a Virginia lawyer and politician who served in the Virginia House of Delegates from 1998 to 2005 and as Secretary of Administration in the Cabinet of Virginia Governor Tim Kaine from 2006 to 2010.

Biography
Baskerville was born in Richmond, Virginia. Her educational background includes a B.A. degree from the College of William and Mary earned in 1973, and a J.D. degree from the University of Iowa College of Law earned in 1979. Furthermore, she also studied abroad on a Fulbright Fellowship in Bonn, Germany.

Prior to her appointment as Secretary of Administration, she served on the Richmond, Virginia City Council from 1994 to 1997, including a stint as the city's Vice Mayor under then-Mayor Tim Kaine. Following her tenure as Vice Mayor, she was elected to the Virginia House of Delegates, serving from 1998 to 2005. In 2005, she became the first African-American woman to seek the Democratic Party nomination for Lieutenant Governor of Virginia, coming in second place in the four-way primary behind State Senator Leslie L. Byrne, but ahead of State Delegate Chap Petersen, and State Senator Phillip Puckett. Following the 2005 general election, she served as Co-chair of Governor Tim Kaine's Transition Team, and was succeeded in the State House by Democrat Jennifer McClellan.

As Secretary of Administration in the Virginia Governor's Cabinet, she was responsible for overseeing several state government agencies including the Virginia State Board of Elections, the Department of General Services, the Department of Human Resources Management, and the Department of Minority Business Enterprise. She was the only African-American woman to serve in Governor Kaine's Cabinet.

She was succeeded as Virginia Secretary of Administration by Lisa Hicks-Thomas in January, 2010, and was subsequently appointed as CEO of the Girl Scouts of Virginia.

References

External links
Archival Records
Archived Web Site of the Virginia Secretary of Administration, 2006-2010 part of Governor Timothy Kaine Administration Collection, 2006-2010 at Virginia Memory
A Guide to the Viola O. Baskerville Papers, 1961-2005 (bulk 1994-2005) at The Library of Virginia

1951 births
Living people
State cabinet secretaries of Virginia
Democratic Party members of the Virginia House of Delegates
Women state legislators in Virginia
Richmond, Virginia City Council members
African-American state cabinet secretaries
African-American women in politics
Girl Scouts of the USA people
College of William & Mary alumni
University of Iowa College of Law alumni
African-American state legislators in Virginia
Women city councillors in Virginia
African-American city council members in Virginia
20th-century American politicians
20th-century American women politicians
21st-century American politicians
21st-century American women politicians